Yang Hui-cheon (born 8 December 1982) is a South Korean cyclist. He competed in two events at the 2004 Summer Olympics.

References

1982 births
Living people
South Korean male cyclists
Olympic cyclists of South Korea
Cyclists at the 2004 Summer Olympics
Place of birth missing (living people)
Cyclists at the 2006 Asian Games
Asian Games medalists in cycling
Medalists at the 2006 Asian Games
Asian Games bronze medalists for South Korea